is a Japanese football player.

Career
Fumiya Suzuki joined FC Tokyo in 2016. On June 12, he debuted in J3 League (v Fujieda MYFC).

References

External links

1998 births
Living people
Waseda University alumni
Association football people from Tokyo
Japanese footballers
Association football forwards
J3 League players
Singapore Premier League players
Azul Claro Numazu players
FC Tokyo players
FC Tokyo U-23 players
Albirex Niigata Singapore FC players
Japanese expatriate footballers
Japanese expatriate sportspeople in Singapore
Expatriate footballers in Singapore